This is a list of Tamil language films released in India during 2006.

Released films

January — March

April — June

July — September

October — December

Other

The following films also released in 2006, though the release date remains unknown.

Awards

References

2006
Films, Tamil
Lists of 2006 films by country or language
2000s Tamil-language films